Suur Strait is the strait in Estonia, lying between Muhu and Continental Estonia. The strait (being itself part of Väinameri) connects Väinameri and Gulf of Riga.

Several islets are located in the strait: e.g. Papirahu, Kesselaid, Kõbajad, Viirelaid.

The strait maximum depth of 24 m is the deepest point in Väinameri.

Kuivastu Harbour is located at the strait. A ferry crosses the strait from Virtsu to Kuivastu.

As of 2020 the Estonian Ministry of Economic Affairs was assessing the possibility of building either a bridge or tunnel across the Suur Strait.

See also
 Väike Strait

References

Geography of Estonia